This article lists important figures and events in Malaysian public affairs during the year 1995, together with births and deaths of notable Malaysians.

Incumbent political figures

Federal level
Yang di-Pertuan Agong: Tuanku Jaafar
Raja Permaisuri Agong: Tuanku Najihah
Prime Minister: Dato' Sri Dr Mahathir Mohamad
Deputy Prime Minister: Dato' Sri Anwar Ibrahim
Chief Justice: Eusoff Chin

State level
 Sultan of Johor: Sultan Iskandar
 Sultan of Kedah: Sultan Abdul Halim Muadzam Shah
 Sultan of Kelantan: Sultan Ismail Petra
 Raja of Perlis: Tuanku Syed Putra
 Sultan of Perak: Sultan Azlan Shah
 Sultan of Pahang: Sultan Ahmad Shah
 Sultan of Selangor: Sultan Salahuddin Abdul Aziz Shah (Deputy Yang di-Pertuan Agong)
 Sultan of Terengganu: Sultan Mahmud Al-Muktafi Billah Shah
 Yang di-Pertuan Besar of Negeri Sembilan: Tunku Naquiyuddin (Regent)
 Yang di-Pertua Negeri (Governor) of Penang: Tun Dr Hamdan Sheikh Tahir
 Yang di-Pertua Negeri (Governor) of Malacca: Tun Syed Ahmad Al-Haj bin Syed Mahmud Shahabuddin
 Yang di-Pertua Negeri (Governor) of Sarawak: Tun Ahmad Zaidi Adruce Mohammed Noor
 Yang di-Pertua Negeri (Governor) of Sabah: Tun Sakaran Dandai

Events
1 January – The display of cigarette packets in advertisements was banned by the Malaysian federal government.
26 January – The Proton Perdana, Malaysia's first luxury car was launched.
March – The skybridge of the Petronas Twin Towers opened to the public.
31 March–2 April – 1995 Malaysian motorcycle Grand Prix
1 April – Malaysian singer, Siti Nurhaliza won Bintang HMI.
26 April – The 1995 General Elections. Barisan Nasional (BN) won this election.
29 June – 20 people were killed in the landslide at Genting Highlands slip road near the Karak Highway.
July – The Tengku Tengah Zaharah Mosque in Kuala Terengganu was fully constructed. This was the first floating mosque in Malaysia. 
10 July – Tun Dr Mahathir Mohamad celebrated his 70th birthday.
3 August – The KTM Komuter, Malaysia's first electrified commuter train service began operation.
15 September – 34 people were killed and 19 survived when Malaysia Airlines Flight 2133, a Fokker 50 plane, crashed near Tawau Airport in Tawau, Sabah after a failed go-around.
October – Amanah Saham Wawasan 2020 (ASW 2020) was launched.
19 October – The new federal administrative centre of Putrajaya was established.
20 October – The Sumur City Aerospace Adventure exhibition was held in Sumur City, Shah Alam.
29 November – Sabah Air Helicopter carrying eleven Petronas workers crashed into the Samarang Sea.
12 December – The STAR Light Rail Transit (LRT) (Light Rail Transit) began operations in Kuala Lumpur. It was the first LRT system in the city.

Births
 3 January – Muhd Nor Azam Abdul Azih – Footballer
 1 February – Zahirah MacWilson  – Actress
 15 February – Adib Zainudin – Footballer
 24 February – Syazwan Zaipol Bahari – Footballer 
 25 February –  Thanabalan Nadarajah – Footballer
 21 April – Sharifah Aryana  – Actress
 5 May – Amirul Hisyam Awang Kechik – Footballer
 23 May – Najwa Latif  – Singer
 1 June – Janna Nick  – Actress and singer
 4 June – Irfan Zakaria  – Footballer
 28 June – Syafiq Ahmad – Footballer
 4 August – Soo Teck Zhi  – Badminton player 
 16 August – Irfan Shamshuddin – Discus thrower 
 16 October – Chew Yiwei – Diver 
 20 October – Amelia Thripura Henderson  – Actress
 Unknown date – Aminulrasyid Amzah – student (died 2010)

Deaths
 2 January – Mustapha Harun — former  state Yang di-Pertua Negeri (Governor) and chief ministers and The Father Of Violin.
 16 February – Tan Sri Dato' Loh Boon Siew ("Mr Honda") — father of Malaysian motorcycles
 18 March – Tun Ahmad Rafee — 2nd  state Yang di-Pertua Negeri (Governor) (1965-1973)
 19 April – Tun Osman Mohd Jewa – First Malaysian armed forces general
 16 June – Senu Abdul Rahman — Former USM Vice Chancellor and Malaysian ambassador to United Nations
 17 November - Tun Said Keruak — 7th  state Yang di-Pertua Negeri (Governor) (1987-1994)

See also
 1995 
 1994 in Malaysia | 1996 in Malaysia
 History of Malaysia

References

 
Malaysia
1990s in Malaysia
Years of the 20th century in Malaysia
Malaysia